is a 1987 dating sim developed by Square and Nintendo R&D1, and published by Nintendo exclusively in Japan for the Famicom Disk System. The game was released on December 1, 1987. It was one of the first dating sim games. It was designed by Hironobu Sakaguchi, who also created the Final Fantasy series, and Yoshio Sakamoto, who co-created Metroid. The music for the game was composed by Nobuo Uematsu and Toshiaki Imai.

Gameplay
The game's protagonist enters Tokimeki High School and runs into a girl wearing glasses who looks identical to Miho Nakayama. Though the game is a standard text command-style adventure game similar to the Famicom Tantei Club series, in important scenes, the player is required to select a facial expression in addition to a verbal response. The four expressions (straight face, laughter, sadness, anger) must match the content of the response being given, and any incorrect responses immediately lead to the "game over" screen. This increased the game's difficulty considerably in comparison to other text adventure games where there were fewer incorrect choices. Some scenes specifically require that the dialogue not match with the expression. For instance, choosing a dialogue expressing joy with a straight face may be the correct choice in a certain situation because it represents a deeper level of emotion and thought on the part of the protagonist. This system allowed the game to simulate a level of complexity resembling actual love relationships, leading to its classification as a dating simulation rather than an adventure game. The game has two different endings, depending on the choices made during the game, and the prizes receivable via the Disk Fax network differed for each ending.

Development

Nakayama Miho no Tokimeki High School was the first bishōjo game featuring a Japanese idol. Miho Nakayama, a popular actress and singer in Japan during the 1980s, is featured on the game's cover and makes a cameo appearance in the game itself. It was created through a collaboration between Nintendo and Square Co., the later of which had just finished Final Fantasy. The game was developed by Hironobu Sakaguchi (creator of Final Fantasy), and Yoshio Sakamoto (producer of Metroid). Sakamoto, then in his fifth year at Nintendo, was excited at the prospect of making an adventure game, but came up with an idea of using a real life celebrity instead of creating a new character, to make the game feel like an "event" or a "kind of festival". The game was developed in a two-week period.

It was the third game compatible with the Disk Fax network of the Disk System, and uses a blue floppy disk instead of the regular yellow disk. In 1987 Square wanted to make a Disk Fax adventure game, and Nintendo suggested that the game include an idol, as it would interest players. Though most compatible games used the Disk Fax network to upload high scores or time trials onto the official rankings system, Nakayama Miho no Tokimeki High School was the only game where players used the network to register that they had completed the game to receive prizes. The game also contained a phone number which players could call to hear hints concerning the gameplay or listen to a personal message voiced by Miho Nakayama herself. This phone service ended shortly after the release of the game, and the messages and hints are displayed in text form in subsequent versions of the game. The Disk Fax service was used for a contest from December 19, 1987, to February 29, 1988, in which 8000 winners received an autographed phonecard (for those who finished the game with the "normal" ending) and 8000 received a special VHS tape (for those who finished with the "best" ending.)

Reception 
The game topped the bi-weekly Japanese Famitsu sales chart in December 1987.

In reader votes of Japanese Family Computer Magazine, the game received a 17.40 out of 25.

1UP.com called it the 10th "Sorta Significant Famicom Games", citing it status as a forerunner of the dating simulation game that would later become popular in Japan. GamesRadar listed the Japanese television commercial as one of the best and strangest Nintendo Entertainment System commercials.

Notes

References

External links
Nakayama Miho no Tokimeki High School at GameFAQs
Review by |tsr on atarihq.com
Miho Nakayama's Tokimeki High School at NinDB

1987 video games
Dating sims
Famicom Disk System games
Famicom Disk System-only games
High school-themed video games
Japan-exclusive video games
Nintendo games
Square (video game company) games
Video games based on real people
Video games based on musicians
Video games scored by Nobuo Uematsu
Video games developed in Japan